Symphony: Live in Vienna is a live concert by Sarah Brightman, inspired by her Symphony album. It was originally only available as a premium for a donation to the Public Broadcasting Service (PBS) in the United States. A lower-level donation would yield a free copy of the DVD, and a higher-level donation would yield a set containing both the DVD and a companion CD.

The 75-minute concert was recorded on 16 January 2008 at Stephansdom (St. Stephen's) Cathedral in Vienna, Austria. The audience consisted of a small group of invited guests and members of Sarah Brightman's official website's fan area, to whom free tickets were made available.

Recorded in 5.1 Surround Sound, the DVD has over 40 minutes of special features. They include a photo gallery, two separate interviews with Sarah concerning the production and the songs of Symphony, and an interview with Father Anthony Faber and historian Elisabeth Lloyd-Davis focusing on the location of the concert.

Track listing
 "Pie Jesu"
 "Fleurs du Mal"
 "Symphony"
 "Sanvean"
 "Canto della Terra" (feat. Alessandro Safina)
 "Sarai Qui" (feat. Alessandro Safina)
 "Attesa"
 "I Will Be with You" (feat. Chris Thompson)
 "Storia d'Amore"
 "Pasión" (feat. Fernando Lima)
 "Running"
 "Let It Rain"
 "Phantom of the Opera" (feat. Chris Thompson)
 "Time to Say Goodbye"
 "Ave Maria"

Album

The CD and the CD/DVD package were released on 10 March 2009. The DVD includes a picture gallery with pictures from the concert, two interviews with Brightman, as well as an interview about the cathedral with Father Anthony Faber and historian Elisabeth Lloyd-Jones. The CD in the CD/DVD package includes a bonus studio recording of Brightman performing "Vide Cor Meum" by Patrick Cassidy.

Track listing

Charts and certifications

Charts

Certifications
Live album

Live DVD recording

References

Concert films
Sarah Brightman albums
Live video albums
2009 video albums
2009 live albums